Eulepidotis hebe is a moth of the family Erebidae first described by Heinrich Benno Möschler in 1890. It is found in the Neotropics, including Puerto Rico.

References

Moths described in 1890
hebe